Verkhnyaya Rassolnaya is a rural locality (a village) in Dvurechenskoye Rural Settlement, Permsky District, Perm Krai, Russia. The population was 15 as of 2010. There is 1 street.

Geography 
Verkhnyaya Rassolnaya is located 40 km southeast of Perm (the district's administrative centre) by road. Rassolnaya is the nearest rural locality.

References 

Rural localities in Permsky District